Neoprotoparmelia australisidiata is a species of areolate lichen in the family Parmeliaceae. Found in Australia, it was formally described as a new species in 2018 by Garima Singh and André Aptroot. The type specimen was collected by Gintaras Kantvilas north of Emerald Springs (Northern Territory); here it was found growing on the wood or bark of a Cooktown ironwood tree. The lichen has also been recorded in New South Wales. The specific epithet refers both to its Australian distribution, and the presence of isidia. Secondary chemicals in the lichen that are detectable with thin-layer chromatography include alectoronic acid (major), and minor to trace amounts of dehydroalectoronic acid and β–alectoronic acid.

References

australisidiata
Lichen species
Lichens described in 2018
Lichens of Australia
Taxa named by André Aptroot